Justin Hayford (born March 11, 1970) is a Chicago-based singer and pianist. He performs jazz and cabaret music and specializes in reviving obscure and forgotten songs from the past. Justin writes and presents cabaret shows at various venues in Chicago, and has released a number of albums.

He also worked as Case Manager of the Legal Council for Health Justice from 1991 through at least 2017, and wrote theater reviews for the Chicago Reader newspaper from 1987 until 2019.

Biography
Justin Hayford was born in Rochester, New York, on March 11, 1970.

The roots of Justin's musical talent are to be sought in his family: many of his family members are musicians. His mother, Charlotte Cain, and her two sisters formed a close-harmony singing group called The Cain Sisters, who sang on the Chicago radio station WLS in their own show, and later performed on NBC Radio. Charlotte's father, Noble Cain, was the choral director at Northwestern University, as well as the musical director at NBC Radio and a well known composer of a cappella music. Justin's father, John Hayford, plays the piano, clarinet and trombone, although this is not his main occupation.

Justin grew up in an environment where music was greatly appreciated, which formed his own appreciation of music. He, however, felt insecure about his musical skills. He was the only one in his family who did not get formal musical training. He taught himself to play the piano using the piano at his home, but he disliked singing. Trying to avoid all possibilities for a musical career, he started pursuing a degree in astrophysics at Northwestern University. He later switched to mathematical studies and subsequently moved on to a department called Interpretation which deals with the analysis and performance of literature. Eventually, he earned a master's degree in Interpretation.

That field of study drew him to the theater. Justin and his acquaintance Audrey Heller formed a group called Industrial Theater, and the two started creating original evening-length image-based performance pieces which examined contemporary social anxieties.

At that time Justin took an interest in the problems of people suffering from AIDS. He began volunteering at the AIDS Legal Council of Chicago (later renamed to Legal Council for Health Justice) which protects the rights of people living with HIV and AIDS and provides free legal services to them. Justin spent a year there as a volunteer and was then promoted to the position of case manager. He worked at the Legal Council through at least 2017, advocating for people who have been discriminated against, fighting to secure their public benefits, helping them prepare the estate planning documents, struggling to secure green cards or asylum for recent legal immigrants.

Shortly after taking the job with the Legal Council Justin recommenced his musical pursuits. He started playing an electric piano as a means of recreation and relaxation. By continuous practice Justin gradually discovered the basics of music theory by himself, becoming more and more skillful by learning from his mistakes.

After learning about jazz chords for several years, Justin tentatively began to sing while he played. Initially, those attempts produced unsatisfactory results, but Justin persisted and achieved improvement. Justin got familiar with and started to admire the music of Matt Dennis, an American singer and pianist, whose voice was not very powerful but he used it to great effect. Justin found a resemblance between his voice and Dennis’ voice, so he saw in Dennis a model from which he could learn.

From that moment on Justin began to search out little known songs from the 1930s and 1940s and performed them before his friends. His first cabaret performance happened in Chicago at his birthday party. He performed 16 songs for an audience of about 30 people. Later Justin started performing in a piano bar on a regular basis which helped him develop his distinctive style. After that Justin began creating full-length cabaret shows and presenting them at Davenport's Piano Bar & Cabaret in Chicago.

Music

Style
Justin's main musical interest is in little-known songs from the Great American Songbook by composers such as Cole Porter, Frank Loesser, Bobby Troup. Justin revives songs that were forgotten a long time ago or that never became popular when they were created. Thus he rescues dozens of songs from undeserved obscurity. He believes that many of these overlooked songs are valuable and should not have sunk into oblivion.

The main feature of Justin's performances is understatement, i.e. singing quietly, withholding a lot, avoiding everything pushy and showy, communicating with the audience in an easy and relaxed manner, instead of trying to dominate.

Justin's style is to some extent an opposition to what he finds negative in the typical jazz singing. He believes that the song must stay in the foreground, while the singer must remain in the background. Unlike many jazz singers, he does not try to impress the audience with vocal virtuosity, but puts the emphasis on the beauty of the melody and lyrics of the song.Justin says he is not a typical musician in the sense that he does not make special efforts to gain popularity or sell his records. He cherishes music too much to turn it into his job. For this reason his main occupation continues to be his legal work.

Recordings
Justin has recorded at least four albums for Lee Lessack's LML Music label, which was dedicated to cabaret, jazz and Broadway music. All four albums are collections of little-known old songs.
A Rare Find: Forgotten Gems from the American Popular Songbook. Released 2001. After performing for three years at various Chicago venues, Justin decided to put together some of his favorite songs, and so his debut album appeared. It contains songs mostly from the 1930s and 1940s by famous songwriters such as Harold Arlen, Frank Loesser ("I Go For That"), Burke and Van Heusen ("Humpty Dumpty Heart"), Comden and Green ("You’re Awful"), Steve Allen ("Kiss Me with a Smile"), Hugh Martin ("I’m Not So Bright"), Joseph Meyer ("According to the Moonlight").
Look Who's Been Dreaming: Neglected Treasures from Hollywood's Golden Age. Released 2004. This album is a collection of songs from old Hollywood movies: "Please Pardon Us, We’re in Love" (from You Can’t Have Everything), "Us on a Bus" (from Summer Wives), "Baby Mine" (from Dumbo), "Look Who's Been Dreaming" (from The Farmer Takes a Wife), "Never Swat a Fly" (from Just Imagine).
It All Belongs to You: Unsung Cole Porter. Released 2007. This album comprises songs by the renowned American composer and songwriter Cole Porter.
Here I'll Stay. Release/d 2012, via Bandcamp.
For these albums, Justin worked with the bassist Jim Cox and the drummer Phil Gratteau, and sometimes with additional musicians.

Awards and recognition
In 2001 After Dark Chicago Magazine gave Justin its "Outstanding Cabaret Artist" Award.

References
"No-Hit Wonder", Chicago Social Magazine, November 2001
"Singer Doesn't Go By Numbers", Chicago Sun-Times, May 26, 2002
"Chi Lives: Justin Hayford's Unclaimed Melodies", Chicago Reader, March 2, 2001
"Justin Hayford's Cabaret Sound Comes Naturally", Chicago Tribune, February 6, 2004
"Romantic Sensation", South Bend Tribune, November 4, 2005

Notes

External links
Justin Hayford at LML Music
Justin's Last.fm page with free songs to listen and download
Review of the album Look Who's Been Dreaming (please scroll to the bottom of the page)
Review of the album It All Belongs To You

American jazz pianists
American male pianists
American jazz singers
Cabaret singers
American crooners
Singers from Chicago
HIV/AIDS activists
1970 births
Living people
Jazz musicians from Illinois
21st-century American male singers
21st-century American singers
21st-century American pianists
American male jazz musicians